Vinny Sullivan (born 19 April 1981 in Waterford) is an Irish footballer who last played for Waterford United in the League of Ireland. Vinny plays as a forward.

Playing career

Early career 
Vinny left Dungarvan United for Celtic at the age of 17. He transferred to Livingston in 2002 in a season where they finished third in the SPL, and spent a brief period on loan at Cowdenbeath.

Waterford United
Vinny signed for Waterford United in 2002 and made an immediate impact as he helped the Blues to the League of Ireland First Division title, contributing thirteen goals in the process. He was a virtual ever-present for Waterford. He finished as runners up in the FAI Cup in 2004.

Cork City
Sullivan spent the 2006 season with Cork City F.C. Cork were defending the title they won in 2005 when Sullivan was scoring for Waterford United but Vinny did not play much. He left the club in December after coach Damien Richardson agreed to cancel his contract.

Waterford United
Vinny found himself back in the Premier Division with Waterford United for the 2007 season after Shelbourne were relegated. He left the club for a brief period in 2009 to concentrate on Gaelic football with Dungarvan, but on 26 August 2009, he signed again with Waterford United.

Cork City
Vinny returned to Cork City in 2011. He scored a 35-yard curler on his return against Waterford in the quarter final of the Munster Senior Cup on 13 February. On 4 March, he scored the winner on his home debut, in a 1-0 league win over Wexford Youths.

Honours
Cork City
League of Ireland First Division (1): 2011

References

Living people
1981 births
League of Ireland players
Waterford F.C. players
Cork City F.C. players
Association football forwards
Republic of Ireland association footballers
Republic of Ireland expatriate association footballers
Expatriate footballers in Scotland
Celtic F.C. players
Livingston F.C. players
Cowdenbeath F.C. players